The George P. Coleman Memorial Bridge (known locally as simply the Coleman Bridge) is a double swing bridge that spans the York River between Yorktown and Gloucester Point, in the United States state of Virginia. It connects the Peninsula and Middle Peninsula regions of Tidewater, Virginia. The bridge is the only public crossing of the York River, though State Route 33 crosses both of its tributaries (the Mattaponi and Pamunkey Rivers) just upriver of their confluence at West Point.

History
Originally built in 1952, it was reconstructed and widened in 1995 through an unusual process which greatly reduced the time the important commuter artery was out-of-service from conventional methods. The current -long double-swing-span bridge carries United States Route 17, a four-lane arterial highway. The movable span is needed to allow ship access to several military installations that are upstream of the bridge, most notably, the United States Navy's Naval Weapons Station Yorktown. The bridge is the largest double-swing-span bridge in the United States, and second largest in the world.

The toll bridge was named for George P. Coleman, who from 1913 to 1922 was the head of the Virginia Department of Highways and Transportation, predecessor to the Virginia Department of Transportation (VDOT). The bridge has been one of the sites of a special program to establish and encourage nesting locations for the peregrine falcon population of Virginia.

Toll rates
The George P. Coleman Memorial Bridge is a toll facility. Tolls are only collected northbound, and are used to pay for the expansion of the bridge to four lanes. Toll Collection Rates are as follows:

Bicycles 0¢
EZ-Pass (transponder required) 85¢
Motorcycles 85¢
Two-axle vehicles $2
Three-axle vehicles $3
Four- or more-axle vehicles $4

Bicycles taking advantage of the free crossing must use the established bicycle lane located to the right of the far right travel lane.

Photos

See also
 
 

List of bridges documented by the Historic American Engineering Record in Virginia

References

External links

PBS.org description of the bridge

VDOT website for Peregrine Falcon news
Roads to the Future: George P. Coleman Bridge

Swing bridges in the United States
Toll bridges in Virginia
Monuments and memorials in Virginia
Bridges completed in 1952
Road bridges in Virginia
U.S. Route 17
Bridges of the United States Numbered Highway System
Historic American Engineering Record in Virginia
Steel bridges in the United States
Buildings and structures in York County, Virginia
Buildings and structures in Gloucester County, Virginia